Vitrinite is one of the primary components of coals and most sedimentary kerogens. Vitrinite is a type of maceral, where "macerals" are organic components of coal analogous to the "minerals" of rocks. Vitrinite has a shiny appearance resembling glass (vitreous). It is derived from the cell-wall material or woody tissue of the plants from which coal was formed. Chemically, it is composed of polymers, cellulose and lignin.

The vitrinite group, which consists of various individual vitrinite macerals, is the most common component of coals. It is also abundant in kerogens that are derived from the same biogenic precursors as coals, namely land plants and humic peats. Vitrinite forms diagenetically by the thermal alteration of lignin and cellulose in plant cell walls. It is therefore common in sedimentary rocks that are rich in organic matter, such as shales and marls with a terrigenous origin, or some terrigenous content. Conversely, carbonates, evaporites and well-sorted sandstones have very low vitrinite contents. Vitrinite is absent in pre-Silurian rocks because land plants had not yet evolved.

Vitrinite reflectance

The study of vitrinite reflectance (or VR) is a key method for identifying the maximum temperature history of sediments in sedimentary basins. The reflectance of vitrinite was first studied by coal explorationists attempting to diagnose the thermal maturity, or rank, of coal beds. More recently, its utility as a tool for the study of sedimentary organic matter metamorphism from kerogens to hydrocarbons has been increasingly exploited. The key attraction of vitrinite reflectance in this context is its sensitivity to temperature ranges that largely correspond to those of hydrocarbon generation (i.e. 60 to 120 °C). This means that, with a suitable calibration, vitrinite reflectance can be used as an indicator of maturity in hydrocarbon source rocks. Generally, the onset of oil generation is correlated with a reflectance of 0.5-0.6% and the termination of oil generation with reflectance of 0.85-1.1%. The onset of gas generation ('gas window') is typically associated with values of 1.0-1.3% and terminates around 3.0%. However these generation windows vary between source rocks with different kerogen types (vitrinite is typically abundant in 'Type III' kerogen-rich source rocks), so a conversion to 'Transformation Ratio' (TR) can be applied to create a kerogen-specific maturity parameter. The vitrinite reflectance value represents the highest temperature that the vitrinite maceral (and source rock) has experienced, and is routinely used in 1D burial modelling to identify geological unconformities in sedimentary sections.

Typically vitrinite reflectance data is presented in units of %Ro, the measured percentage of reflected light from a sample which is immersed in oil (%Ro = % reflectance in oil).

The lack of vitrinite macerals in marine shales with little terrestrial input often requires alternative maturity parameters instead of vitrinite reflectance such as heating the sample to determine the hydrocarbons present (Rock-Eval Tmax in industry jargon), biomarker equivalences and other maceral reflectance parameters (e.g. liptinite reflectance).

See also 
 Geology
 Coal
 Exinite
 Basin modelling
 Fossil fuels

References 

Sedimentology
Coal
Economic geology